Bukit Panjang MRT/LRT station is a Mass Rapid Transit (MRT) and Light Rail Transit (LRT) interchange station on the Downtown line (DTL) and the Bukit Panjang LRT line (BPLRT) in Singapore. Located in the namesake estate of Bukit Panjang, the station is at the junction of Upper Bukit Timah Road and Petir Road. The station serves the commercial buildings of Bukit Panjang Plaza, Hillion Mall and Junction 10. It forms a part of the Bukit Panjang Integrated Transport Hub (BPITH), which also contains a bus interchange.

The LRT station opened on 6 November 1999 along with the other stations on the BPLRT. It later became an interchange station and the terminus of the DTL after the opening of DTL Stage 2 on 27 December 2015. Primarily serving the estate and other developments in the vicinity, the DTL station is not directly linked to the BPLRT station, with an unpaid link connecting the two stations. Nevertheless, it is recognised as a paid transfer within a 15-minute grace period.

History

Bukit Panjang LRT

The station was announced on 12 April 1996 when details for the BPLRT line were revealed by then Communications Minister Mah Bow Tan. The LRT station opened on 6 November 1999.

An LRT train had hit a switch beam at the Bukit Panjang station at about 5:40pm on 29 August 2001, resulting in the power failure. As a result, 10,000 peak-hour commuters were stranded at the station the next morning for repair works to the LRT service. Service resumed at 10:15am later on that day.

In 2015, half-height platform barriers were installed on the LRT platforms. Bukit Panjang and Choa Chu Kang stations were first prioritised on the BPLRT line to have them installed due to foreseen high commuter traffic from the DTL. These barriers were installed in an effort to mitigate people falling or trespassing onto the tracks.

Downtown Line

On 15 July 2008, when the station locations were revealed for Downtown line Stage 2 (DTL2), the DTL station for the Bukit Panjang area was initially called Petir as a working name. When questioned by the public if the station could be directly linked to Bukit Panjang LRT station instead, the Land Transport Authority (LTA) replied that there were technical constraints for the line to sharply turn towards the LRT station and back to Woodlands Road. Nevertheless, plans were made for connections between Petir DTL station and the Bukit Panjang LRT station. In the end, the station was located along Upper Bukit Timah Road and was not directly connected to the BPLRT. The DTL station name was eventually finalised as Bukit Panjang on 16 June 2009.

Construction was scheduled to commence in the third quarter of 2009 and targeted to complete by 2015.

Excavation works for DTL2 caused a sinkhole on Woodlands Road on 16 March 2013. The sinkhole, which was reported to be as wide as one lane, was patched up soon after. Investigations revealed that the construction works destabilised the soil, rupturing an underground water pipe. The soil movement and the rupture of the pipe caused the sinkhole to open up. No motorists or pedestrians were injured in the incident. On 9 April 2014, a fire broke out at a construction site for the Downtown line in the early morning. No injuries were reported and the fire was put out in 30 minutes. Originally expected to open in 2016, the station opened on 27 December 2015 along with the other DTL Stage 2 stations, a few months ahead of schedule.

Exit C began construction in 2014, significantly later than the rest of the station as only two entrances to the station were initially planned. A successful campaign by residents living in the Senja area to their local Members of Parliament (MPs) led to the approval of an additional exit by LTA. Originally slated to open in December 2016, it opened later on 9 February 2018, connecting the station to Bukit Panjang Road. The construction of the entrance faced challenges such as the presence of high rock levels during excavation and multiple utilities crossing over the construction shaft of the new entrance. More time was needed for manual mining works for the entrance, to prevent damage to vital utilities which cannot be diverted.

Extension to Sungei Kadut
An additional extension of the DTL to Sungei Kadut station from Bukit Panjang station was announced on 25 May 2019 by the LTA. The extension is expected to be completed by the mid-2030s.

Station details

Services

The station is an interchange between the DTL and BPLRT. The station code is BP6/DT1, as reflected on official maps. On the BPLRT, the LRT station is after Phoenix station. Services on the BPLRT then loop around the Bukit Panjang estate, via Petir station (Service B) or Senja station (Service A) after this station. There were services to Ten Mile Junction station until it closed on 13 January 2019 via Service C which operated with reduced frequency due to low ridership. Train frequencies on the BPLRT range between 2.5 and 5 minutes.

On the DTL, the station is currently the line's terminus. The DTL station is not directly connected to the BPLRT station and hence commuters have to exit either of the stations to transfer to another line via a link bridge at the LRT station's mezzanine level. The transfer is considered a "valid transfer" of a "journey" as long as it does not exceed 15 minutes. Train frequencies on the DTL range between 2 and 5 minutes.

Station design
The LRT station has the conventional barrel-roof design seen on other BPLRT stations. The design was chosen by the Bukit Panjang residents during the construction of the BPLRT.

The DTL station, designed by local architectural firm SAA Architects, has three levels. Like all stations on the DTL, the station has barrier-free access for the disabled, with features such as lifts, wheelchair-accessible toilets, wider faregates and tactile flooring for the visually-impaired. The station entrances are shaped like pavilions along a park connector. The entrances' design is intended to mimic passenger flow with vertical screens interspersed with streaks of blue, giving the appearance of rippling waves. Such patterns are also adopted for the vent shafts which blends into the landscape. In addition, the patterns provide a distinguishing  marker for the station.

Public artwork
An artwork Punctum of the Long Hills by John Clang is displayed at the DTL platforms of the station as part of the network's Art-in-Transit Programme. The artwork showcases a row of tall Housing Development Board (HDB) flats, subtly reflecting the long hilly landscape for which Bukit Panjang is named after. The two giant-sized boys peeking around public housing blocks in the artwork signifies a sense of curiosity and the spirit of adventure.

References

External links

 

Railway stations in Singapore opened in 1999
Bukit Panjang
LRT stations of Bukit Panjang LRT Line
Mass Rapid Transit (Singapore) stations
Light Rail Transit (Singapore) stations